HMS Opal was an Admiralty M-class destroyer of the Royal Navy. She served in the First World War following her construction at Sunderland in 1915. Attached to the 12th Destroyer Flotilla based with the Grand Fleet at Scapa Flow, Opal had an eventful short life, which ended in shipwreck after two and a half years of service.

Construction and design

Opal was one of 25 destroyers (consisting of 22 M-class destroyers and three s) ordered in late November 1914 as part of the Third War Programme. The M class was the latest class of destroyers ordered for the Royal Navy before the outbreak of the First World War, and this order was one of a series of large orders for destroyers of this class placed in the early months of the war which resulted in 90 ships being ordered by May 1915 in addition to ships ordered prior to the outbreak of the war.

Opal was laid down at William Doxford & Sons shipyard in Sunderland on 1 February 1915, and was launched on 11 September 1915. The ship reached a speed of  during sea trials early in 1916, and commissioned in April 1916.

Service
On commissioning, Opal joined the 12th Destroyer Flotilla, based at Scapa Flow as part of the Grand Fleet. Opal took part in the Battle of Jutland where the Twelfth Flotilla supported the Grand Fleet, and both attacked and was attacked during the general action. She also participated in other major fleet sorties during the next two years as well as pursuing her regular duties of minesweeping, convoy protection and anti-submarine patrols in the North Sea.

On 24 July 1917, Opal and the destroyer  were escorting an east-bound convoy on the Scandinavian (Lerwick–Norway) route, when the convoy came under attack by the German submarine , which fired two torpedoes from distance at the convoy, one of which hit and sank the Swedish merchant ship . In response, Opal followed back the track of the torpedo and dropped a depth charge on the estimated location of the submarine, but U-67 escaped unharmed.

On 12 January 1918, Opal joined her sister ship  and the light cruiser  in a night patrol to hunt German auxiliary warships suspected to be laying mines on the Scottish coast. By 17:30, the weather had deteriorated to such an extreme degree that the destroyers were in danger of swamping and foundering and visibility was near zero. Fearing that her companions might sink, Boadicea ordered Opal and Narborough back to Scapa Flow while she continued alone. For the next four hours, Opal regularly sent reports indicating her course and intention to return, but at 21:27, a garbled message stating have run aground was received, followed by silence. The weather was so atrocious that no vessels could be despatched until the following morning, and it was two days before Opal was found, battered, broken and empty on the Clett of Crura off the east coast of South Ronaldsay. Narborough was found in a similar position nearby. One survivor — William Sissons — was later located on a small islet, and he related that the ships had been sailing a regular slow course making frequent soundings and radio reports, but had suddenly crashed headlong into the rocks, probably due to a navigation error by Opals captain. Both wrecks were abandoned and broken up by the sea over the next few weeks taking the bodies of both crews, bar the single survivor, with them.

Pennant numbers

Notes

References

External links
Kieran Brady's website dedicated to the sinking of HMS Opal & HMS Narborough
BBC Article on the discovery of a long-lost ring from HMS Opal
 Photo of HMS Opal
Another photo
Battle of Jutland Crew Lists Project - HMS Opal Crew List

Admiralty M-class destroyers
Ships built on the River Wear
1915 ships
World War I destroyers of the United Kingdom
World War I shipwrecks in the North Sea
Maritime incidents in 1918
1918 disasters in the United Kingdom